Omsky (masculine), Omskaya (feminine), or Omskoye (neuter) is the name of several rural localities (settlements) in Russia:
Omsky, Krasnoyarsk Krai, a settlement in Ketsky Selsoviet of Pirovsky District of Krasnoyarsk Krai
Omsky, Omsk Oblast, a settlement in Omsky Rural Okrug of Omsky District of Omsk Oblast